Pas Kuh (also Romanized as Pas Kūh; also known as Khers Kānlū) is a village in Sivkanlu Rural District, in the Central District of Shirvan County, North Khorasan Province, Iran. At the 2006 census, its population was 115, in 25 families.

References 

Populated places in Shirvan County